Round Lake is a small lake in Camas, Washington, USA. The lake is connected at its north-west tip to Lacamas Lake. Lacamas Park includes access to Round Lake for fishing, picnicing, grilling, hiking, and jogging. The park includes a trail that goes entirely around Round Lake, and across the approximately  dam that controls the level of Lacamas Lake and Round Lake. Anglers can expect to find rainbow trout, brown trout, bluegill and smallmouth bass.

Water quality
Lacamas Park also contains a small information center that describes the deteriorating water quality in both Lacamas Lake and Round Lake. According to the signs present, precipitation captured over 43,000 acres (174 km²) forms the Lacamas Creek which flows into both Lacamas Lake and Round Lake. This water contains a higher than normal amount of pollutants which are rapidly diminishing the water quality of both lakes.

External links
Information on government monitoring of the lake

Camas, Washington
Lakes of Clark County, Washington
Round Lake
Tourist attractions in Clark County, Washington